Jeremy Rose (born April 1, 1979 in Bellefonte, Pennsylvania) is an American Thoroughbred racehorse jockey. He began his career as a professional rider at Delaware Park in Wilmington, Delaware and in 2001 was his breakout year and he was voted the United States' Eclipse Award for Outstanding Apprentice Jockey.

In 2005, Rose guided Afleet Alex, to victory in two American Classic Races, the Preakness and Belmont Stakes. His performances that year earned him the ESPY Award as the top American jockey of 2005. He earned his 1000th career victory at Delaware Park on July 3, 2005.

In 2008, Rose was suspended for six months by the Delaware Thoroughbred Racing Commission for whipping Appeal to the City in the head during a June 23 race at Delaware Park. Rose, the horse's trainer and its owner, have asserted it was an accident and the suspension is under appeal.

Jeremy Rose currently resides in Elkton, Maryland.

Early life
Rose was a top wrestler at Bellefonte Area High School.

Year-end charts

References

External links
 Jeremy Rose at the NTRA

1979 births
Living people
American jockeys
Eclipse Award winners
People from Bellefonte, Pennsylvania
People from Elkton, Maryland
Sportspeople from Pennsylvania